Colour Kanavugal is a 1998 Indian Tamil-language drama film, written and directed by Vishva. The film stars Karan and Khushbu, while Manivannan and Thalaivasal Vijay portray supporting roles. Music for the film was composed by Adithyan and the film opened to mixed reviews in March 1998.

Cast
 Karan as Bharani
 Khushbu as Pooja 
 Manivannan
 Thalaivasal Vijay
 Vennira Aadai Moorthy
 Thyagu
 Pandu

Soundtrack
Soundtrack was composed by Adithyan.

Release
The film opened to negative reviews in March 1998, with a critic noting "nothing goes well in this movie", and "either way the sufferers are the viewers".

References

1998 films
1990s Tamil-language films
1998 directorial debut films